Natrolite is a tectosilicate mineral species belonging to the zeolite group. It is a hydrated sodium and aluminium silicate with the formula .  The type locality is Hohentwiel, Hegau, Germany.

It was named natrolite by Martin Heinrich Klaproth in 1803. The name is derived from natron, the Greek word for soda, in reference to the sodium content, and lithos, meaning stone.  Needle stone or needle-zeolite are other informal names, alluding to the common acicular habit of the crystals, which are often very slender and are aggregated in divergent tufts.  The crystals are frequently epitaxial overgrowths of natrolite, mesolite, and gonnardite in various orders.

Properties 
Larger crystals most commonly have the form of a square prism terminated by a low pyramid, the prism angle being nearly a right angle. The crystals are tetragonal in appearance, though actually orthorhombic. There are perfect cleavages parallel to the faces of the prism. The mineral also often occurs in compact fibrous aggregates, the fibers having a divergent or radial arrangement. Natrolite is readily distinguished from other fibrous zeolites by its optical characteristics.

Between crossed nicols the fibers extinguish parallel to their length, and they do not show an optic figure in convergent polarized light. Natrolite is usually white or colorless, but sometimes reddish or yellowish. The luster is vitreous, or, in finely fibrous specimens, silky.

The specific gravity is 2.2, and the hardness is 5.5. The mineral is readily fusible, melting in a candle-flame to which it imparts a yellow color owing to the presence of sodium. It is decomposed by hydrochloric acid with separation of gelatinous silica.

Environment 
Natrolite occurs with other zeolites in the amygdaloidal cavities of basaltic igneous rocks.  It is also common in nepheline syenites.

Notable localities 
Excellent specimens of diverging groups of white prismatic crystals are found in compact basalt at the Puy-deMarman, Puy-de-Dôme, France. Huge crystals have been found on the Kola Peninsula, Russia (30 cm by 13 cm). The walls of cavities in the basalt of the Giants Causeway, in County Antrim, are frequently encrusted with slender needles of natrolite, and similar material is found abundantly in the volcanic rocks (basalt and phonolite) of Salesel, Aussig and several other places in the north of Bohemia.  Mont St. Hilaire, Quebec has produced large crystals associated with many rare minerals. The Bay of Fundy in Nova Scotia, New Jersey, Oregon, and British Columbia have also produced excellent specimens.

Several varieties of natrolite have been distinguished by special Nips. Fargite is a red natrolite from Glenfarg in Perthshire. Bergmannite, or Spreustein, is an impure variety which has resulted by the alteration of other minerals, chiefly sodalite, in the augite syenite of southern Norway.

Natrolite is one of the closely associated minerals with Benitoite, a rare mineral with the type locality in San Benito County, California.

Images

See also 

 Pressure-induced hydration

References

External links

Structure type NAT
Mineral Galleries
Mindat
Webmineral

Attribution

Tectosilicates
Sodium minerals
Aluminium minerals
Zeolites
Orthorhombic minerals
Minerals in space group 43
Luminescent minerals